John Paul Crawford (born January 11, 1995) is an American professional baseball shortstop for the Seattle Mariners of Major League Baseball (MLB).

After growing up in Lakewood, California, Crawford attended Lakewood High School, where he achieved recognition for his athletic performance; Crawford also was considered one of the nation's best teenage baseball players. The 16th pick overall in the 2013 MLB draft, Crawford began his career with the Philadelphia Phillies as an exceptional defensive infielder and was considered the organization's top prospect for much of his rise through their minor league system. Prior to the  season, Crawford was traded to the Mariners.

Early life 
Crawford was born on January 11, 1995, in Long Beach, California, to Larry and Beth Crawford; he has two sisters. His father, a former professional Canadian football defensive back, was a four-time All-Star in the Canadian Football League (CFL) and won the Grey Cup with the BC Lions in the 1985, while Crawford's mother played collegiate volleyball.  Crawford's cousin, Carl Crawford, played in Major League Baseball (MLB). His older sister Eliza, a softball player for California State University, Fullerton, brought the young Crawford with her to batting practices and encouraged him in his pursuits. Thereafter, Crawford was highly involved in baseball programs for urban youth in nearby Compton, including the Urban Youth Academy and Reviving Baseball in Inner Cities. He grew up a Los Angeles Dodgers fan.

In 2009, Crawford began attending Lakewood High School. The school's head baseball coach Spud O'Neil recalled Crawford "was 6–2 and skinny as a rail" but recognized his flair defensively, and immediately accommodated the freshman by opening a spot at shortstop—‌Crawford's natural position. Crawford posted several team records; by the end of his senior year, he led in career hits (179), runs scored (162), stolen bases (73) and walks (72). His talents drew the attention of the University of Southern California (USC) which offered Crawford an athletic scholarship to attend and play college baseball for the Trojans. As anticipated, however, Crawford declined the offer and elected to partake in the 2013 MLB draft.

Professional baseball

Minor leagues 

In 2011, during Crawford's junior year, he was evaluated by Marti Wolever, the assistant general manager of the Philadelphia Phillies. The circumstances of Crawford's discovery by the Phillies are inadvertent; by Wolever's account, he first watched the shortstop while scouting another Lakewood prospect, pitcher Shane Watson, whom the Phillies selected with their first-round draft pick in the 2012 Major League Baseball draft. Wolever stated in 2012 "I thought he [Crawford] was one of the best players we saw last year", and anticipated that the prospect would be ready for the major leagues in three or four years. The Phillies selected Crawford in the first round of the 2013 MLB draft, 16th overall, and he signed his first professional baseball contract on June 18, worth $2.30 million.

The Phillies had high expectations for Crawford—‌expectations significantly profound that the organization envisioned the prospect as the eventual long-term replacement for former MVP shortstop Jimmy Rollins. Crawford made his first appearance as a professional ballplayer with the Gulf Coast Phillies of the Gulf Coast League (GCL) in Clearwater, Florida. Once the regular season began, he adjusted well at the plate and to professional baseball overall; in 39 games with the GCL Phillies, Crawford led the league in both batting average (.345) and on-base percentage (.443), earning him a promotion to the Single-A Lakewood BlueClaws. Returning to Lakewood in 2014, attention was focused on Crawford for his improved plate discipline, as he nearly finished the season, shared with a promotion to the Clearwater Threshers, with a 1-to-1 strikeout-walk ratio. Crawford became the fixture of the Phillies' farm system, the team's number one prospect according to Baseball America for the rest of his ascent through the minor leagues.

In 2015, Crawford's season was cut short by his first significant injury—‌a torn ligament in his left thumb. Playing just 104 games, between Clearwater and the Double-A Reading Phils, he finished his season hitting .288 with six home runs, 42 RBIs and 12 stolen bases. Crawford kept up his efforts to develop his power numbers in 2016 but by early 2017, with the Lehigh Valley IronPigs, Crawford scrambled to produce hits, batting just .175 with one home run at the end of May. Over his next 60 games Crawford returned to regular form, posting a .272 batting average and a career high 12 home runs. With the Phillies' shortstop position firmly entrenched by Freddy Galvis, Crawford began starting at third base on August 20 in preparation of sharing time with Maikel Franco, who struggled throughout his fourth season in the majors.

Philadelphia Phillies

2017 
Opening the season with AAA Lehigh Valley, Crawford achieved YouTube immortality on July 26 with an inside-the-park grand slam at Coca-Cola Park (Allentown, PA), capped off with a decoy slide under the tag of Gwinnett's David Freitas.  In the latter half of 2017, the Phillies had re-equipped the team with young players like Rhys Hoskins and Jorge Alfaro. Phillies manager Pete Mackanin expressed interest in Crawford, hoping the prospect could play substantially before the end of the regular season. During a Phillies road trip, Crawford was promoted to the major leagues on September 5, 2017, to join the team in time for the second game in a three-game series against the New York Mets. Playing at third base in his MLB debut Crawford went 1-for-5, hitting into a fielder's choice in his first at-bat, before singling to center field in the fifth inning; the Phillies won the game 9–1. Mackanin rotated Crawford between starts at shortstop, third base, and second base during the final month of the regular season. He ended the year batting .214 with six RBIs in 23 games.

2018, final season with the Phillies
Freddy Galvis was traded to the San Diego Padres early in the 2017 offseason, securing Crawford's position as the Phillies' Opening Day shortstop for 2018. The team, under their new manager Gabe Kapler, focused on branding their roster with players–including Crawford in his larger role–who could "control the strike zone" and post high on-base percentages (OBP). In his first 20 games, Crawford struggled at the plate–batting .190–and defensively, committing five errors in that stretch. He was placed on the 10-day disabled list (DL) on April 29 after suffering a strained right forearm. He returned to the roster on June 6, sharing starts at third base with Franco. In a game with the St. Louis Cardinals on June 19, however, Crawford was hit by a pitch, breaking his left hand and returning him to the DL. After rehabbing, he struggled to find consistent playing time for the remainder of the season, limiting him to just six starts; he finished the season batting .214 with three home runs and 12 RBIs.

Seattle Mariners

2019 
On December 3, 2018, the Phillies traded Crawford and Carlos Santana to the Seattle Mariners in exchange for Jean Segura, James Pazos and Juan Nicasio. On March 13, 2019, the Mariners optioned Crawford to AAA Tacoma Rainiers. On May 10, 2019, the Mariners called up Crawford following an impressive stint in AAA, hitting a .319/.420/.457 slash line with 7 doubles, 3 home runs and 15 RBI and reaching base in all 31 games with the Rainiers. He made his Mariners debut on the same day against the Boston Red Sox at Fenway Park. Crawford's first home run as a Mariner came off Michael Pineda against the Minnesota Twins on May 16, 2019. Crawford spent the remainder of the season as the starting shortstop for Seattle, hitting .226 with 7 home runs and 46 RBI in 93 games.

2020 
In 2020, Crawford batted .255/.336/.338 with two home runs, 24 RBIs and 33 runs scored in 53 games during the pandemic-shortened season. He was awarded the Gold Glove Award for the best defensive shortstop in the American League in 2020.

2021
On June 19, 2021, Crawford hit his first career grand slam off of Tampa Bay Rays starting pitcher Josh Fleming. He finished the 2021 season batting .273/.338/.376 with 9 home runs and 54 RBIs. He led all shortstops with 222 putouts.

2022
On March 22, 2022, Crawford signed a $4.85 million contract with the Mariners, avoiding salary arbitration.  Then, on April 8, 2022, Crawford and the Mariners reached a 5-year $51 million contract extension. During a June 26 game against the Los Angeles Angels at Angel Stadium, a bench-clearing brawl ensued after teammate Jesse Winker was hit in the thigh by an alleged beanball from Angels pitcher Andrew Wantz. Winker later then got into an altercation with Ryan Tepera, in which Crawford was seen throwing punches at Tepera. Crawford, along with several other players from both the Mariners and Angels, was ejected from the game, with this being Crawford's first career ejection.

Personal
Crawford is a distant cousin of former major league baseball player Carl Crawford.

Crawford and his wife, Kathleen, got married in December 2021.

References

External links

 

1995 births
Living people
People from Lakewood, California
Baseball players from California
Major League Baseball shortstops
Gold Glove Award winners
Philadelphia Phillies players
Seattle Mariners players
Florida Complex League Phillies players
Lakewood BlueClaws players
Clearwater Threshers players
Reading Fightin Phils players
Glendale Desert Dogs players
Lehigh Valley IronPigs players
Tacoma Rainiers players
Modesto Nuts players